Les noces de Jeannette (Jeannette's Wedding) is an opéra comique in one act by Victor Massé to a libretto by Jules Barbier and Michel Carré. It had its premiere in Paris in the Salle Favart at the Opéra-Comique, 4 February 1853.

Roles and role creators
Jean baritone – Joseph-Antoine-Charles Couderc
Jeannette soprano – Marie-Caroline Miolan-Carvalho
Pierre tenor – Begat	 
Thomas bass – Louis Palianti

Recordings
 Ninon Vallin (Jeannette), Léon Ponzio (Jean), M. Laurent (Thomas), Mme. De Busson (Pierre), Orchestra and chorus of the Opéra-Comique, Paris, conductor Laurent Halet. Recorded by Pathé in 1922. Reissued by Marston Records, Marston 53010-2 (2011).

References

External links
 Libretto in French

Operas by Victor Massé
French-language operas
Opéras comiques
One-act operas
Operas
1853 operas
Opera world premieres at the Opéra-Comique
Libretti by Jules Barbier
Libretti by Michel Carré